2011 UEFA European Under-17 Football Championship (qualifying round) will be the first round of qualifications for the Final Tournament of UEFA U-17 Championship 2011. 

The qualifying round will be played between September 17 and November 1, 2010.  The 52 teams were divided into 13 groups of four teams, with each group being contested as a mini-tournament, hosted by one of the group's teams.  After all matches have been played, the 13 group winners and 13 group runners-up will advance to the Elite round. 

Alongside the 26 winner and runner-up teams, the two best third-placed teams also qualify. These are determined after considering only their results against their group's top two teams, and applying the following criteria in this order:
Higher number of points obtained in these matches;
Superior goal difference from these matches;
Higher number of goals scored in these matches;
Fair-play conduct of the teams in all group matches in the qualifying round;
Drawing of lots.

The host team of each group's mini-tournament are indicated in italics in the tables below.

Group 1 

Local time is UTC+2.

Group 2

Group 3

Local time is UTC+4.

Group 4 

Local time is UTC+2.

Group 5 

Local time is UTC+1.

Group 6 

Local time is UTC+3.

Group 7 

Iceland ranked ahead of Turkey on head-to-head result

Local time is UTC.

Group 8 

Local time is UTC+3.

Group 9 

Local time is UTC+3.

Group 10 

Local time is UTC+2.

Group 11 

Local time is UTC+2.

Group 12 

Local time is UTC+2.

Group 13 

Local time is UTC+2.

Ranking of 3rd placed teams 
Counting results against group winners and runners-up. Top 2 advanced to the Elite Round.

References 

UEFA.com

External links 
 UEFA website

Qualification
UEFA European Under-17 Championship qualification